Aïn El Hadjar may refer to the following places in Algeria:

Aïn El Hadjar, Bouïra
Aïn El Hadjar, Saïda